The Naval Review was first published in February 1913 by a group of eight Royal Navy officers. They had formed a naval society "to promote the advancement and spreading within the service of knowledge relevant to the higher aspects of the naval profession" in 1912.

The eight founders were
Captain Herbert Richmond
Commander Kenneth Dewar
Commander the Hon. Reginald Plunkett
Lieutenant Roger Bellairs
Lieutenant T. Fisher
Lieutenant Henry Thursfield
Captain Edward Harding
Admiral William Henderson (Honorary Editor)

The Naval Review is the journal of professional record of the Royal Navy. The Royal Navy and Naval Review - an independent journal whose charitable purposes are to serve the interests of the Royal Navy - have enjoyed over a century of a unique relationship. In respecting this special relationship, and in acknowledgement of established MoD communications policy, the Naval Review is limited to membership by subscription only (ie not on sale, or routinely promulgated, to the wider public). But such agreement, is on the clear understanding that, to the benefit of both the Navy and the Review, that the Naval Review sustains its independent voice and continues to encourage ‘reasonable challenge’ to accepted policy amongst its members.

For its part the Royal Navy values the Naval Review’s central purpose to encourage serving officers to debate relevant professional matters in clear, concise and persuasive ways and develop the art of self-expression and professional knowledge and understanding to the longer-term benefit of the Service.

References

External links
 

1913 establishments in the United Kingdom
Quarterly magazines published in the United Kingdom
English-language magazines
Magazines established in 1913
Maritime history magazines
Military magazines published in the United Kingdom
Royal Navy